, more literally the Hachinohe City Buried Cultural Property Center, opened in Hachinohe, Aomori Prefecture, Japan in 2011.

Gallery

See also
 List of National Treasures of Japan (archaeological materials)
 Jōmon Archaeological Sites in Hokkaidō, Northern Tōhoku, and other regions
 List of Historic Sites of Japan (Aomori)
 Aomori Prefectural Museum

References

External links

 Hakodate Jōmon Culture Center

Hachinohe
Museums in Aomori Prefecture
Archaeological museums in Japan
2011 establishments in Japan
Museums established in 2011
Jōmon period